Ethan Harris may refer to:

Ethan Harris (singer)
Ethan Harris (lacrosse), player on Scotland national men's lacrosse team